This page shows the results of the Diving Competition for men and women at the 1979 Pan American Games, held from July 1 to July 15, 1979 in San Juan, Puerto Rico. There were two events, for both men and women.

Men's competition

3m Springboard

10m Platform

Women's competition

3m Springboard

10m Platform

Medal table

See also
 Diving at the 1980 Summer Olympics

References
 Sports 123

1979 Pan American Games
1979
1979 in diving